Emmanuel Mosahary is a Bodoland People's Front politician from Assam. He was elected in Assam Legislative Assembly election in 2016 from Tamulpur constituency.

References 

Living people
Bodoland People's Front politicians
People from Baksa district
Assam MLAs 2016–2021
Year of birth missing (living people)
Bharatiya Janata Party politicians from Assam